An angler's loop, otherwise known as a perfection loop, is a type of knot which forms a fixed loop. Useful for fine or slippery line, it is one of the few loop knots which holds well in bungee cord. It is quite secure, but it jams badly and is not suitable if the knot will need to be untied.

Tying
Angler's loop may be tied 
 alone and then used, 
 it may be tied in the bight or at the working end
 it may be tied one handed
 it may be fashioned with several loops
 it may be locked for additional stability
 it may be tied at high speed in an emergency
 it may be tied through an object (typically a ring).
 

Angler's loop may be tied around the hand, it may also be tied this way one handed, or with several loops if need be:

 Angler's loop may be locked additionally with half hitches

 Angler's loop may be fashioned with several loops (then locking may be necessary)

Structure 
Overhand knot on standing part and half-hitch by the working end.

See also
 List of knots

References

 Blandford, Percy W. (2012) Practical Knots and Ropework page 92, Courier Corporation. 

 Bloomsbury Publishing (2013) The Knot Bible: The Complete Guide to Knots and Their Uses page 143. A & C Black. 

 Budworth, Geoffrey (2012) The Knot Book Hachette UK. 

 Finazzo, Scott (2016) Prepper's Guide to Knots: The 100 Most Useful Tying Techniques for Surviving any Disaster page 117, Ulysses Press. 

 Popular Mechanics (2008) How to Tempt a Fish: A Complete Guide to Fishing page 78, Sterling Publishing Company. 

 Toss, Brion and Gae Pilon (2009) Chapman Knots for Boaters pages 68–68, Sterling Publishing Company. 

 Whippy, Jim (2013) Reeds Knot Handbook: A Pocket Guide to Knots, Hitches and Bends pages 82–83, A & C Black.

External links
Perfection (Angler's) Loop Knot. animatedknots.com.

Fishing knots